Sex and the City (advertised as Sex and the City: The Movie) is a 2008 American romantic comedy film written and directed by Michael Patrick King in his feature film directorial debut. It is a continuation of the 1998–2004 television series about four friends, Carrie Bradshaw (Sarah Jessica Parker), Samantha Jones (Kim Cattrall), Charlotte York Goldenblatt (Kristin Davis) and Miranda Hobbes (Cynthia Nixon), and their lives as women in New York City.

The world premiere took place at Leicester Square in London on May 15, 2008, and premiered on May 28, 2008, in the United Kingdom and on May 30, 2008, in the United States. Despite mixed reviews from critics, calling the film an extended episode of the series, it was a commercial success, grossing over $415 million worldwide from a $65 million budget.

A sequel to the film, titled Sex and the City 2, was released in 2010 to similar commercial success but even larger critical failure. A third film was announced in December 2016, but was ultimately cancelled and replaced by a sequel miniseries, And Just Like That..., on HBO Max.

Plot
Taking place a few years after the events of the Sex and the City television series, Carrie is now in a committed relationship with Mr. Big, and they are viewing apartments with plans to move in together. Carrie falls in love with a penthouse far from their price range. Big offers to pay for it. Carrie offers to sell her own apartment, although she also fears that she would have no legal rights to their home in case they separate, as they are not married. To quell her fears, Big suggests that they marry. Charlotte hires her longtime friend, Anthony Marantino, as the wedding planner.

Carrie shows Anthony and Charlotte the vintage suit she plans to marry Big in, but no one except Carrie loves it. Carrie is asked by her Vogue editor Enid to do a spread for Vogue called "The Last Single Girl". She gets to dress up in fancy couture gowns and is gifted a gown from Vivienne Westwood, which she decides to wear instead of her suit. The ensuing publicity of her engagement blows up her small wedding to a big affair, which makes Big increasingly uncomfortable.

Miranda, who has settled down in Brooklyn with Steve to raise Brady together, has been so busy with work, that she has not had sex with Steve in six months. When Steve confesses he has cheated on her, Miranda is devastated and immediately leaves him. At Carrie and Big's rehearsal dinner, Steve tries to reconcile with Miranda, but she is still upset and tells Big bluntly that marriage ruins everything. On the wedding day, a stressed-out Big cannot go through with the ceremony. As a devastated Carrie flees the wedding, Big quickly realizes his mistake and catches up with Carrie, who furiously attacks him with her bouquet in the middle of a one-way street.

Miranda tells Charlotte that she may have upset Big, and she wants to tell Carrie. Charlotte tells her not to, as Big has always had doubts about marriage. To console Carrie, the women take her on the honeymoon that she had booked to Mexico, where they de-stress and collect themselves. Upon returning to New York, Carrie hires an assistant, Louise, to help her manage her life. She gets her apartment back, and Louise helps her put up her website. Charlotte, who is married to Harry and has adopted a Chinese girl named Lily, learns she is pregnant. She is fearful that something might happen to her baby, but Carrie reassures her.

On Valentine's Day, Carrie and Miranda have dinner, where she tells Miranda that reading the Vogue article about her and Big's engagement made her realize that she had become so consumed with the wedding that it was not about her and Big anymore; it was all about her. Miranda then confesses to Carrie that she made Big upset and doubtful at the rehearsal dinner. Carrie is furious that she had ruined her wedding. After a few days, Miranda gets Carrie to talk to her, and begs for her forgiveness; Carrie asks that she does the same for Steve. Miranda attends couples counseling with Steve and they eventually reconcile.

Meanwhile, Samantha is now living in Los Angeles to be close with Smith, but often flies to New York to hang out with Carrie, Miranda and Charlotte. As she returns to Los Angeles, she is shown to be lonely, with Smith constantly shooting films from morning until night. Watching her sexy neighbor Dante have sexual flings, she buys a dog, overeats and goes shopping to distract herself. Finally admitting she misses her old single life even though she loves Smith, she breaks up with him and moves back to New York. Meanwhile, Louise quits her job to move back to St. Louis and get married.

Later, Charlotte encounters Big, leaving her so outraged that her water breaks. Big takes her to the hospital and waits until baby Rose is born, hoping to see Carrie. Harry tells Carrie that Big would like her to call him, having written to her frequently but never receiving a reply. Carrie soon finds in Louise's files that he has sent her many emails: letters copied from books she read him before their wedding, culminating with one of his own where he apologizes for screwing up and promises to love her forever.

Carrie goes to the penthouse Big had bought for them to collect a pair of brand new Manolo Blahnik shoes that she had left there. She finds Big in the walk-in closet he had built for her. Her anger at his betrayal dissipates and she runs into his arms. After reflecting on how perfectly happy they were before talking about marriage, Big proposes to Carrie, using one of her crystal-encrusted shoes in place of a ring. They marry alone in a simple wedding in New York City Hall, with Carrie wearing the simple vintage suit. Miranda, Samantha, and Charlotte turn up to surprise her, having been called by Big.

The film ends with the four women sipping cosmopolitans, celebrating Samantha's 50th birthday, with Carrie making a toast to the next 50 years.

Cast
 Sarah Jessica Parker as Carrie Bradshaw
 Kim Cattrall as Samantha Jones
 Kristin Davis as Charlotte York Goldenblatt
 Cynthia Nixon as Miranda Hobbes
 Chris Noth as John James "Mr. Big" Preston
 Jennifer Hudson as Louise, Carrie's Assistant
 David Eigenberg as Steve Brady
 Jason Lewis as Jerry "Smith" Jerrod
 Evan Handler as Harry Goldenblatt
 Willie Garson as Stanford Blatch
 Mario Cantone as Anthony Marentino
 Lynn Cohen as Magda
 Candice Bergen as Enid Frick
 Annaleigh Ashford as Spoiled Label Queen
 André Leon Talley (cameo) as Vogue Magazine Executive
 Joseph Pupo as Brady Hobbes, Miranda and Steve's Son
 Alexandra and Parker Fong as Lily Goldenblatt, Charlotte and Harry's Daughter
 Gilles Marini as Dante
 Monica Mayhem as Dante's Lover #1
 Julie Halston as Bitsy Von Muffling
 Daphne Rubin-Vega as Baby-Voiced Girl
 Ben Rindner as The Waiter
 Bridget Everett as Drunk Party Girl
 Veanne Cox as Halloween Woman #1
 Philipp Christopher as Married Man

Production

Development

At the end of Sex and the Citys run in 2004, there were indications of a film being considered following the series. HBO announced that Michael Patrick King was working on a possible script for the film which he would direct. Later that year, Kim Cattrall declined to work on the project citing reasons that the script and the start date were overly prolonged and she decided to take other offers at hand. As a result, the immediate follow-up ideas for the film were dropped.

It was in mid-2007 that the plans for making the film were announced again. This reportedly resulted after Cattrall's conditions being accepted along with a future HBO series.
In May 2007 the project was halted after HBO decided it was no longer in a position to finance the film on its own. The project was pitched within the Time Warner family (owners of HBO) and was picked by sister concern New Line Cinema.

Filming
The film was prominently shot in New York between September–December 2007. The locations included a number of places around Manhattan and a certain portion was shot in Steiner Studios and Silvercup Studios. The shooting was continually interrupted by paparazzi and onlookers with the security and police authorities employed in order to control the crowd. 
Efforts were taken to keep the film's plot secret, including the shooting of multiple endings. As a defense strategy, scenes shot in public or in presence of number of extras were termed by Ryan Jonathan Healy and the main cast as "dream sequences".

Costumes
As in the TV series, fashion played a significant role in plot and production of the film. Over 300 ensembles were used over the course of the entire film. 
Patricia Field, who created costume designs for the series, also undertook the job in the film.
Field has stated that she initially was ambivalent to do the film, for monetary and creative reasons.
Field rose to fame particularly after designing for the series from 1998 to 2004, wherein she popularized the concept of using designer clothes with day-to-day fashion.

While dressing the characters for the film, Field decided to stay clear from the latest fashion trends defining the characters and instead focused on the evolution of individual character and the actor portraying it, over the last four years. While Samantha's dressing was influenced by American TV soap opera Dynasty (see Nolan Miller), Jackie Kennedy was the inspiration for Charlotte's clothes. Miranda, according to Field, has evolved the most from the series in terms of fashion. This was influenced significantly by development in actress Cynthia Nixon in past years.
 The wedding dress was made by Vivienne Westwood.
 The tutu outfit that Carrie models for the other girls is the same outfit she wears on the show's credits.
 Carrie's assistant, Louise, rents her designer handbags from Bag Borrow or Steal.
 Hats for Vivienne Westwood in the film are made by Prudence Millinery.
 H. Stern lent more than 300 pieces of jewelry to the film.
 Costumes were also selected from collections by haute couture designer Gilles Montezin.

Music

Soundtrack

The soundtrack was released May 27, 2008, by New Line Records. The soundtrack includes new songs by Fergie and Jennifer Hudson (who plays Carrie's assistant in the film).

The film's soundtrack debuted at number two on the Billboard 200, the highest debut for a multi-artist theatrical film soundtrack since 2005's Get Rich or Die Tryin', and debuting at number six on the UK Albums Chart, selling to date more than 55,000 copies.

A second soundtrack, Sex and the City: Volume 2, was released on September 23, 2008, coinciding with the film's DVD release, featuring the British singers Estelle, Craig David, Mutya Buena and Amy Winehouse. It also featured Janet Jackson, Ciara, and Elijah Kelley.

Score
In December 2008, the orchestral score for the film was released, Sex And The City - The Score, containing 18 tracks of original score composed, co-orchestrated, and conducted by Aaron Zigman. While the order of the tracks does not correspond directly to the order that the score is heard in the film, the score soundtrack contains almost every single piece of score that is present in the film.

Release

Premiere
The film's international premiere took place on May 12, 2008, at Odeon West End in London's Leicester Square to an audience of 1700.
It was next premiered at Sony Center at Potsdamer Platz in Berlin on May 15.
The film had its New York City premiere at Radio City Music Hall on May 27, 2008.

Reception

Box office
The film was a commercial success. Opening in 3,285 theaters, the film made $26.93 million in the US and Canada on its first day. The three-day opening weekend total was $57,038,404, aggregating $17,363 per theater.
The film recorded the biggest opening ever for an R-rated comedy and for a romantic comedy, surpassing both American Pie 2 and Hitch, and also for a film starring all women. This was also the fifth-highest opening weekend for an R-rated film, behind The Matrix Reloaded,  The Passion of the Christ, 300 and Hannibal. As of March 2010, the film had grossed $152,647,258 at the US and Canadian box office, and $262,605,528 in other markets, bringing the worldwide total gross revenue to $415,252,786, making it the highest-grossing romantic comedy of 2008.

Critical response

Sex and the City received mixed reviews from critics. On Rotten Tomatoes, the film has a rating of 49%, based on 182 reviews, with an average score of 5.70/10. The site's critical consensus reads, "Sex and the City loses steam in the transition to the big screen, but will still thrill fans of the show." Metacritic gave the film a normalized average score of 53 out of 100, based on 38 critics, indicating "mixed or average reviews".

Brian Lowry of Variety said the film "...feels a trifle half-hearted", while Carina Chocano of the Los Angeles Times stated "the film tackles weighty issues with grace but is still very funny". She praised Michael Patrick King's work saying very few films "are willing to go to such dark places while remaining a comedy in the Shakespearean sense".
Colin Bertram of the New York Daily News dubbed the film a "great reunion", and was happy with the return of "The 'Oh, my God, they did not just do that!' moments, the nudity, the swearing, the unabashed love of human frailty and downright wackiness".
The Chicago Tribune'''s Jessica Reeves described it as "Witty, effervescent and unexpectedly thoughtful."
Michael Rechtshaffen at The Hollywood Reporter praised the performances of the four leading ladies and said the film kept the essence of the series, but resembled a super-sized episode.

Manohla Dargis of The New York Times found the film "a vulgar, shrill, deeply shallow — and, at 2 hours and 22 turgid minutes, overlong — addendum to a show", while The Daily Telegraph's Sukhdev Sandhu panned the film saying "the ladies have become frozen, Spice Girls-style types - angsty, neurotic, predatory, princess - rather than individuals who might evolve or surprise us". Rick Groen of The Globe and Mail slammed the film commenting on lack of script and adding that the characters "don't perform so much as parade, fixed in their roles as semi-animated clothes hangers on a cinematic runway". He gave the film zero stars out of four. Anthony Lane, a film critic for The New Yorker, called the film a "superannuated fantasy posing as a slice of modern life"; he noted that "almost sixty years after All About Eve, which also featured four major female roles, there is a deep sadness in the sight of Carrie and friends defining themselves not as Bette Davis, Anne Baxter, Celeste Holm, and Thelma Ritter did—by their talents, their hats, and the swordplay of their wits—but purely by their ability to snare and keep a man....All the film lacks is a subtitle: "The Lying, the Bitch, and the Wardrobe."

Ramin Setoodeh of Newsweek speculated that some of the criticism for the film is derived possibly from sexism: "when you listen to men talk about it (and this is coming from the perspective of a male writer), a strange thing happens. The talk turns hateful. Angry. Vengeful. Annoyed...Is this just poor sportsmanship? I can't help but wonder—cue the Carrie Bradshaw voiceover here—if it's not a case of 'Sexism in the City.' Men hated the movie before it even opened...Movie critics, an overwhelmingly male demographic, gave it such a nasty tongue lashing you would have thought they were talking about an ex-girlfriend...The movie might not be Citizen Kane—which, for the record, is a dude flick—but it's incredibly sweet and touching."

The film featured on worst of 2008 lists including that of The Times, Mark Kermode, The New York Observer, the NME, and The Daily Telegraph.

Accolades

Media releases

New Line Home Entertainment (distributed by Warner Home Video) released a DVD and Blu-ray release of Sex and the City: The Movie on September 23, 2008. There are two versions of the film released in the US on home video. There is a standard, single disc theatrical cut (the version seen in theaters) which comes in fullscreen or widescreen (in separate editions). Both discs are the same, except for the film presentation. The only features are an audio commentary, deleted scenes, and a digital copy of the film. Also released on the same day as the standard edition is the two-disc special edition, which adds six minutes of footage to the film, along with the commentary from the standard edition DVD and a second disc that contains bonus features, as well as a digital copy of the widescreen theatrical version of the film. The only version of the film released on Blu-Ray is the two-disc extended cut, which is identical to the DVD version of the extended cut.

On December 9, 2008, New Line Home Entertainment released a third edition of Sex and the City: The Movie. This edition is a 4-disc set entitled Sex and the City: The Movie (The Wedding Collection). The four-disc set features the previously released extended cut of the film on the first disc, the second disc has the bonus features from the extended cut and three additional featurettes, the third disc holds even more special features, and the fourth is a music CD with songs inspired by the film, including the alternative mix of Fergie's "Labels or Love" from the beginning of the film. The set also comes with an exclusive hardcover book, featuring photos and quotes from the film, and a numbered certificate of authenticity in a pink padded box.

A fourth edition was also released in Australia. This set contained the two discs from the Sex and the City: The Movie Special Edition and a bonus 'Sex and the City Inspired' Clutch Bag. This clutch being black in color in a tile or snake skin material.

The DVD has reached the #1 on the UK DVD Top Chart and is the fastest selling DVD release of 2008 in the UK, selling over 920,000 copies in one week. It is way ahead of the 700,000 copies sold for Ratatouille which was, prior to Sex and the City's release, the best selling DVD of 2008 in the UK. Although the record has since been beaten by Mamma Mia!SequelSex and the City 2 was released in cinemas on May 27, 2010, in the United States and May 28, 2010, in the United Kingdom. It was co-written, produced and directed by Michael Patrick King. The DVD was available for purchase in the United Kingdom on November 29, 2010. The film stars Sarah Jessica Parker, Kim Cattrall, Kristin Davis, Cynthia Nixon, and Chris Noth, who reprised their roles from the previous film and television series. It also features cameos from Liza Minnelli, Miley Cyrus, Tim Gunn, Ron White, Omid Djalili, and Penélope Cruz, as well as Broadway actors Norm Lewis, Kelli O'Hara, and Ryan Silverman.

A third film was announced in December 2016, but in September 2017, Sarah Jessica Parker confirmed that it was not going to happen. The third movie was later replaced by the 2021 series And Just Like That...'', with Cattrall not returning.

References

External links

 
 
 
 
 
 
 

Sex and the City
2008 films
2008 directorial debut films
2008 romantic comedy-drama films
2000s buddy comedy-drama films
2000s English-language films
2000s female buddy films
2000s sex comedy films
American buddy comedy-drama films
American female buddy films
American romantic comedy-drama films
American sex comedy films
Films about fashion in the United States
Films about weddings in the United States
Films based on television series
Films directed by Michael Patrick King
Films scored by Aaron Zigman
Films set in Los Angeles
Films set in Manhattan
Films set in Mexico
Films shot in Los Angeles
Films shot in New York City
HBO Films films
New Line Cinema films
Warner Bros. films